Western High School high school located east of Parma, Michigan, United States.  It has classes for grades 9 through 12.  Western is located on Dearing Rd, just inside the border of Spring Arbor Township.  Jared Vickers is the principal.  The school serves the northern half of Spring Arbor Township, a college community, and Parma, a mostly rural farming community.  Other communities served are Woodville and Westwood, both of which are in Blackman, plus much of Sandstone, most of the area around Minard Mills, which is located in the southern portion of Tompkins, and the northeast portion of Concord Township.

Demographics
The demographic breakdown of the 882 students enrolled for the 2020–2021 school year was:
Male - 47.7%
Female - 52.3%
Native American/Alaskan - 0.5%
Asian/Pacific islander - 0.9%
Black - 2.5%
Hispanic - 3.6%
White - 88.3%
Multiracial - 4.2%

In addition, 25.1% of the students qualified for free or reduced lunches.

References 

Public high schools in Michigan
Schools in Jackson County, Michigan
Educational institutions established in 1959
1959 establishments in Michigan